Göyçəkənd (also, Gəyçəkənd, known as Oktyabr until 1999) is a village and municipality in the Goygol Rayon of Azerbaijan. It has a population of 683.

References

Populated places in Goygol District